Waulsort Abbey was a Benedictine monastery located at Waulsort, Wallonia, now in Hastière in the province of Namur, Belgium.

The monastery was founded in 946 by Irish monks. Saint Maccallin and Saint Cathróe were the first two abbots. Saint Forannan (d. 980) was also subsequently abbot of Waulsort.

The abbey was dissolved during the French Revolution in 1793, when it was sacked. The surviving structures have been remodelled as a private house.

The former abbey is principally known as the owner, from the 10th to the 18th century, of the Lothair Crystal.

References 

Christian monasteries in Namur (province)
Benedictine monasteries in Belgium